The 65th Medical Brigade is a medical brigade of the United States Army subordinate to the Eighth United States Army and located at USAG Humphreys in South Korea.

Lineage 
 Constituted 18 October 1927 in the Regular Army as the 15th Medical Regiment.
 Redesignated 28 May 1941 as the 65th Medical Regiment.
 Activated 1 June 1941 at Fort Oglethorpe, Georgia.
 Reorganized and redesignated 10 March 1944 as the 65th Medical Group.
 Inactivated on 16 August 1965 in Germany.
 Activated 25 June 1958 in Korea.
 Inactivated 21 June 1971 at Fort Lewis, Washington.
 Redesignated 12 September 2007 as 65th Medical Brigade.
 Activated 16 October 2008 in Korea.

History 
Originally formed as the 15th Medical Regiment on 18 October 1927. Reorganized as the 65th Medical Regiment in Fort Oglethorpe, Georgia and activated June 1, 1941.

World War II
On March 10, 1944, the Regiment was broken up and redesignated the 65th Medical Group, with its organic companies becoming separate numbered Medical Collecting and Medical Clearing Companies.  The Group served in Normandy, 
Northern France, Rhineland, Ardennes-Alsace, and Central Europe.

Korean Service
The Group was reactivated for service in Korea from 1958-71.

On 15 October 2008, 18th Medical Command was redesignated as the 65th Medical Brigade.  The headquarters was stationed at USAG Yongsan inside the Japanese Army Stockade until the end of 2017.  It then moved to Camp Humphreys as part of the relocation of the Yongsan Garrison.

Organization
 Brigade Headquarters & Headquarters Company
 549th Hospital Center (Brian D. Allgood Army Community Hospital)
 168th Multifunctional Medical Battalion
 106th Medical Detachment (VSS)
 U.S. Army Medical Materiel Center – Korea (USAMMC-K)
 618th Medical Company (Dental Area Support) DENTAC-K

Honors

Unit decorations

References

External links
 
 65th Medical Brigade history 
 Lineage and Honors

065
Military units of the United States Army in South Korea
Military units and formations established in 1927